Destination: B-Sides is a compilation album released by American alternative/indie band Mae. It includes b-sides, remixes, and live recordings of the band's earlier work.

Track listing
All songs written by Mae.

 "This Time Is the Last Time (Wave Remix)" – 3:25
 "Suspension" – 3:50
 "Sun (Acoustic)" – 5:22
 "Tisbury Lane" – 5:45
 "Awakening" – 4:16
 "Futuro (Live)" – 3:11
 "Sun (Live)" – 7:30
 "This Time Is the Last Time (Live)" – 5:23
 "Giving It Away (Acoustic)" – 5:20
 "Goodbye, Goodnight (S.M. Remix)" – 4:31
 "Going to School" (Hidden Track) - 3:41

Personnel 

 Dave Elkins – lead vocals, guitar
 Zach Gehring – guitar
 Jacob Marshall – drums
 Rob Sweitzer – keyboard, vocals, lead vocals on "Awakening"
 Mark Padgett – bass, vocals

Vinyl Release
Destination: B-Sides limited edition vinyl was released by Spartan Records and shipped on 01/21/2015.

References

Mae albums
B-side compilation albums
Albums produced by Aaron Sprinkle
2004 compilation albums
Tooth & Nail Records compilation albums